Splitting (also called black-and-white thinking, thinking in extremes or all-or-nothing thinking) is the failure in a person's thinking to bring together the dichotomy of both perceived positive and negative qualities of something into a cohesive, realistic whole. It is a common defense mechanism wherein the individual tends to think in extremes (e.g., an individual's actions and motivations are all good or all bad with no middle ground). This kind of dichotomous interpretation is contrasted by an acknowledgement of certain nuances known as "shades of gray".

Splitting was first described by Ronald Fairbairn in his formulation of object relations theory; it begins as the inability of the infant to combine the fulfilling aspects of the parents (the good object) and their unresponsive aspects (the unsatisfying object) into the same individuals, instead seeing the good and bad as separate. In psychoanalytic theory this functions as a defense mechanism.

Relationships 
Splitting creates instability in relationships because one person can be viewed as either personified virtue or personified vice at different times, depending on whether they gratify the subject's needs or frustrate them. This, along with similar oscillations in the experience and appraisal of the self, leads to chaotic and unstable relationship patterns, identity diffusion, and mood swings. The therapeutic process can be greatly impeded by these oscillations because the therapist too can come to be seen as all good or all bad. To attempt to overcome the negative effects on treatment outcomes, constant interpretations by the therapist are needed.

Splitting contributes to unstable relationships and intense emotional experiences. Splitting is common during adolescence, but is regarded as transient. Splitting has been noted especially with persons diagnosed with borderline personality disorder. Treatment strategies have been developed for individuals and groups based on dialectical behavior therapy, and for couples. There are also self-help books on related topics such as mindfulness and emotional regulation that claim to be helpful for individuals who struggle with the consequences of splitting.

Borderline personality disorder 

Splitting is a relatively common defense mechanism for people with borderline personality disorder. One of the DSM IV-TR criteria for this disorder is a description of splitting: "a pattern of unstable and intense interpersonal relationships characterized by alternating between extremes of idealization and devaluation". In psychoanalytic theory, people with borderline personality disorder are not able to integrate the good and bad images of both self and others, resulting in a bad representation which dominates the good representation.

Narcissistic personality disorder 

People matching the diagnostic criteria for narcissistic personality disorder also use splitting as a central defense mechanism. Most often narcissists do this as an attempt to stabilize their sense of self-positivity in order to preserve their self-esteem, by perceiving themselves as purely upright or admirable and others who do not conform to their will or values as purely wicked or contemptible.

The cognitive habit of splitting also implies the use of other related defense mechanisms, namely idealization and devaluation, which are preventive attitudes or reactions to narcissistic rage and narcissistic injury.

Depression 
In depression, exaggerated all-or-nothing thinking can form a self-reinforcing cycle: these thoughts might be called emotional amplifiers because, as they go around and around, they become more intense. Typical all-or-nothing thoughts:
 My efforts are either a success or they are an abject failure.
 Other people are either all good or all bad.
 I am either all good or all bad.
 If you're not with us, you're against us.

Janet, Bleuler and Freud 
Splitting of consciousness ("normal self" vs. "secondary self") was first described by Pierre Janet in De l'automatisme psychologique (1889). His ideas were extended by Eugen Bleuler (who in 1908 coined the word schizophrenia from the Ancient Greek skhízō  and phrḗn ) and Sigmund Freud to explain the splitting of consciousnessnot (with Janet) as the product of innate weakness, but as the result of inner conflict. With the development of the idea of repression, splitting moved to the background of Freud's thought for some years, being largely reserved for cases of double personality. However, his late work saw a renewed interest in how it was "possible for the ego to avoid a rupture... by effecting a cleavage or division of itself", a theme which was extended in his Outline of Psycho-Analysis (1940a [1938]) beyond fetishism to the neurotic in general.

His daughter Anna Freud explored how, in healthy childhood development, a splitting of loving and aggressive instincts could be avoided.

Klein 

There was, however, from early on, another use of the term "splitting" in Freud that referred rather to resolving ambivalence "by splitting the contradictory feelings so that one person is only loved, another one only hated ... the good mother and the wicked stepmother in fairy tales". Or, with opposing feelings of love and hate, perhaps "the two opposites should have been split apart and one of them, usually the hatred, has been repressed". Such splitting was closely linked to the defence of "isolation ... The division of objects into congenial and uncongenial ones ... making 'disconnections'".

It was the latter sense of the term that was predominantly adopted and exploited by Melanie Klein. After Freud, "the most important contribution has come from Melanie Klein, whose work enlightens the idea of 'splitting of the object' (in terms of 'good/bad' objects)". In her object relations theory, Klein argues that "the earliest experiences of the infant are split between wholly good ones with 'good' objects and wholly bad experiences with 'bad' objects", as children struggle to integrate the two primary drives, love and hate, into constructive social interaction. An important step in childhood development is the gradual depolarization of these two drives.

At what Klein called the paranoid-schizoid position, there is a stark separation of the things the child loves (good, gratifying objects) and the things the child hates (bad, frustrating objects), "because everything is polarised into extremes of love and hate, just like what the baby seems to experience and young children are still very close to". Klein refers to the good breast and the bad breast as split mental entities, resulting from the way "these primitive states tend to deconstruct objects into 'good' and 'bad' bits (called 'part-objects')". The child sees the breasts as opposite in nature at different times, although they actually are the same, belonging to the same mother. As the child learns that people and objects can be good and bad at the same time, he or she progresses to the next phase, the depressive position, which "entails a steady, though painful, approximation towards the reality of oneself and others": integrating the splits and "being able to balance [them] out ... are tasks that continue into early childhood and indeed are never completely finished".

However, Kleinians also use Freud's first conception of splitting to explain the way "in a related process of splitting, the person divides his own self. This is called 'splitting of the ego'". Indeed, Klein herself maintained that "the ego is incapable of splitting the object—internal or external—without a corresponding splitting taking place within the ego". Arguably at least, by this point "the idea of splitting does not carry the same meaning for Freud and for Klein": for the former, "the ego finds itself 'passively' split, as it were. For Klein and the post-Kleinians, on the other hand, splitting is an 'active' defence mechanism". As a result, by the close of the century "four kinds of splitting can be clearly identified, among many other possibilities" for post-Kleinians: "a coherent split in the object, a coherent split in the ego, a fragmentation of the object, and a fragmentation of the ego".

Kernberg 
In the developmental model of Otto Kernberg, the overcoming of splitting is also an important developmental task. The child has to learn to integrate feelings of love and hate. Kernberg distinguishes three different stages in the development of a child with respect to splitting:
 The child does not experience the self and the object, nor the good and the bad as different entities.
 Good and bad are viewed as different. Because the boundaries between the self and the other are not stable yet, the other as a person is viewed as either all good or all bad, depending on their actions. This also means that thinking about another person as bad implies that the self is bad as well, so it's better to think about the caregiver as a good person, so the self is viewed as good too: "Bringing together extremely opposite loving and hateful images of the self and of significant others would trigger unbearable anxiety and guilt".
 Splitting – "the division of external objects into 'all good' or 'all bad'" – begins to be resolved when the self and the other can be seen as possessing both good and bad qualities. Having hateful thoughts about the other does not mean that the self is all hateful and does not mean that the other person is all hateful either.

If a person fails to accomplish this developmental task satisfactorily, borderline pathology can emerge. In the borderline personality organization, Kernberg found 'dissociated ego states that result from the use of "splitting" defences'. His therapeutic work then aimed at "the analysis of the repeated and oscillating projections of unwanted self and object representations onto the therapist" so as to produce "something more durable, complex and encompassing than the initial, split-off and polarized state of affairs".

Horizontal and vertical 
Heinz Kohut has emphasized in his self psychology the distinction between horizontal and vertical forms of splitting. Traditional psychoanalysis saw repression as forming a horizontal barrier between different levels of the mind – so that for example an unpleasant truth might be accepted superficially but denied in a deeper part of the psyche. Kohut contrasted with this vertical fractures of the mind into two parts with incompatible attitudes separated by mutual disavowal.

Transference 

It has been suggested that interpretation of the transference "becomes effective through a sort of splitting of the ego into a reasonable, judging portion and an experiencing portion, the former recognizing the latter as not appropriate in the present and as coming from the past". Clearly, "in this sense, splitting, so far from being a pathological phenomenon, is a manifestation of self-awareness". Nevertheless, "it remains to be investigated how this desirable 'splitting of the ego' and 'self-observation' are to be differentiated from the pathological cleavage ... directed at preserving isolations".

See also

References 

Borderline personality disorder
Defence mechanisms
Dichotomies
Error
Freudian psychology
Object relations theory
Narcissism
Problem behavior
Psychological abuse
Barriers to critical thinking
Symptoms and signs of mental disorders